Ammon McNeely (June 3, 1970 – February 18, 2023) was an American rock climber, who holds the most Speed Climbing World Records and First One Day Ascents on El Capitan in Yosemite. His  other interests included; BASE jumping, wingsuiting, skydiving, surfing, skateboarding, trail running, mountain biking and snowboarding.  Ammon was also a slackliner and pioneered many highlines throughout the US and had opened up new BASE jumps, as well.

El Capitan rock climbing ascents 
Ammon was the conductor of many ascents on El Capitan, most of them in a day (under 24 hrs): Plastic Surgery Disaster, Wall of the Early Morning Light, Atlantic Ocean Wall, and most recent climbing one of the hardest routes on El Capitan, The Reticent Wall along with Dean Potter & Ivo Ninov in 34 hours and 57 minutes, shaving the existing time by more than five days.

McNeely was recognized as having climbed El Capitan by the most number of different routes - 75 times via 61 routes.

McNeely was the first (Nate Brown is the only other one) to have climbed all three routes on The Streaked Wall in Zion National Park, ascending all three routes with a First One Day Ascent.

In 2011 29 years after the first ascent, McNeely with partner Kait Barber made the second ascent of Wings of Steel with the purpose to examine the controversial methods of the first ascent team. The climb was documented in the Jeff Vargen directed film Assault on El Capitan

El Capitan speed climbing accomplishments 
Some of McNeely's other El Capitan speed climbing accomplishments include:

Lost World: 23:29 - with Ivo Ninov July 7, 2009 (First One Day Ascent)
Never Never Land: 16:00:02 - with Chris McNamara - August 4, 2004 (First One Day Ascent)
Horse Chute: 20:39 - with Chris McNamara - Oct 8, 2004 (First One Day Ascent)
Magic Mushroom: 55:15 - with Ivo Ninov & Kevin Jaramillo - July 4-6th, 2005
The Reticent Wall: 34:57 - with Dean Potter & Ivo Ninov - July 12–13, 2006
Wall of Early Morning Light: 23:43 - with Brian McCray - September, 2004 (First One Day Ascent)
Pacific Ocean Wall: 33:02 - with Ivo Ninov - May, 2004
New Jersey Turnpike: 14:00:02 - with Brian McCray - September, 2002
Atlantic Ocean Wall: 23:38 - with Brian McCray - August 4, 2004 (First One Day Ascent)
Native Son: 23:53 - with Ivo Ninov -  May 15, 2006 (First One Day Ascent)
Iron Hawk: 30:42 - with Cedar Wright - May, 2004
Scorched Earth: 22:28 - with Skiy Detray & David Allfrey
Tangerine Trip: 10:24 - with Cedar Wright - July, 2002
Virginia: 17:24  - with Gabriel McNeely & Ivo Ninov - July 16, 2005
Lost in America: 18:04 - with Brian McCray - August, 2004
Zenyatta Mondatta: 22:56 - with Ivo Nivov & Kevin Jaramillo - June 27, 2005 (First One Day Ascent)
Plastic Surgery Disaster: 21:37 - with Brian McCray - June, 2001 (First One Day Ascent)
Lunar Eclipse: 19:58 - with Jose Pererya & Chongo - June, 2001
Born Under a Bad Sign: 22:22 - with Chris Van Luevan & Eric Walden - October 2, 2001 (First One Day Ascent)
Eagle's Way: 9:08 - with Brian McCray - August, 2004
On the Waterfront: 17:07 - with Skiy Detray & Ammon McNeely - July 15, 2009 (First One Day Ascent - 3rd overall Ascent)
Pressure Cooker: 23:41 - with Ivo Ninov - September, 2004 (First One Day Ascent)
Get Whacked: 12:49 - with Brian McCray - June, 2001 (First One Day Ascent)

BASE jumping injuries 
In October 2013, Ammon nearly lost his foot in a BASE accident in Moab that he described as: "We were with one other jumper who was new, and I voted that Andy goes first, the two new guys go in the middle, and I go last. They had perfect exits, great openings with no wind. I jumped, probably took a tad longer delay than I should have, being it was a new exit with new brake lines, and immediately had a 180-degree opening. I struck the cliff with my left foot and continued rag dolling down the cliff where I finally came to rest on a sloping ledge. I knew I was banged up, but to my utter surprise my foot was flipped on its side looking very similar to a Nalgene bottle with just a sliver of skin keeping it on."

In October 2017, Ammon lost his right leg below the knee in a BASE accident in Moab.

Death 
On February 18, 2023, Ammon was with his girlfriend, enjoying the sunset near Moab, Utah. As Ammon was trying to sit down, he lost his footing under his prosthetic leg and fell backwards off the cliff. He was 52.

References

External links
 RocknClimb.com - Ammon's Website
 Alpinist Article - Nine Records in 2003
 Zodiac Ascent with Timmy O'Neill and his brother Sean, a paraplegic
 One Day Ascent of Native Son
 Podclimber Interview
 Video: Realm of the Flying Monkeys
 Article: The Zodiac with Ammon McNeely - written by Donald Perry
 Gone Sufferin', Zion's Rodeo Queen - by: Chris McNamara
 Video: Ammon breaks leg during MOAB BASE jumping accident Oct2013.

1970 births
2023 deaths
American rock climbers
Sportspeople from Provo, Utah